William Ind (born 26 March 1942) is a retired English Anglican bishop.  He was formerly the Bishop of Truro.

The son of William Robert Ind and Florence Emily Spritey, Ind was educated at the Duke of York's School in Dover, at the University of Leeds, where he graduated with a Bachelor of Arts (BA) in history in 1964 and at the College of the Resurrection in Mirfield.

Career
Ind was ordained deacon in 1966 and priest in 1967. From 1966 to 1971, he was curate of Feltham and from 1971 to 1973 of St Mary's Northolt. In 1973, he became team vicar of Basingstoke, in 1979 Vice-principal of the Aston Training Scheme, in 1982 Director of Ordinands of the Winchester Diocese and member of the Doctrine Commission and in 1984 an honorary canon of Winchester, holding all posts until 1987. He was then Suffragan Bishop of Grantham until 1997, when he was appointed the 14th Bishop of Truro.

Ind has been married to Frances Isobel Bramald since 1967 and they have three sons.

Ind was seen in the BBC series A Seaside Parish and shown visiting Boscastle at the time of the flood there.

On 12 May 2007 he announced to the diocesan synod his intention of retiring on 30 April 2008.

Apology for the church's role in Cornish massacre
In June 2007, Ind said that the massacre of thousands during the vicious suppression of a Cornish Prayer Book Rebellion, more than 450 years ago, was an "enormous mistake" which the church should be ashamed of. Speaking at a ceremony at Pelynt, acknowledging the "brutality and stupidity" of the atrocities on behalf of the church, Ind said:

"I am often asked about my attitude to the Prayerbook Rebellion and in my opinion, there is no doubt that the English Government behaved brutally and stupidly and killed many Cornish people. I don't think apologising for something that happened over 500 years ago helps, but I am sorry about what happened and I think it was an enormous mistake."

Ind also urged the church to accept its culpability for a period in history which saw one in ten of the indigenous Cornish population massacred.  At the Celtic League's AGM in October 2004 at Perranporth, Cornwall, delegates from the six Celtic countries unanimously backed a motion on the church which included a call for the Church of England to acknowledge "its part in provoking and suppressing the 1549 Prayer Book Uprising" and "for all it has done since 1549 and continues to do to suppress Cornwall's national identity, political freedom, language and culture".

Ind also said: "Everything about Cornwall marks it as a place to be treasured and loved," he said. "It has never been an English shire, it has its own language and it reminds us, by its history, of links to Ireland, Wales, Brittany and a Celtic past."

References

1942 births
Alumni of the College of the Resurrection
Bishops of Grantham
Bishops of Truro
20th-century Church of England bishops
21st-century Church of England bishops
Alumni of the University of Leeds
People educated at the Duke of York's Royal Military School
Living people